Road to Paloma is a 2014 American drama thriller film directed by (in his directorial debut), produced by, co-written by, and starring Jason Momoa. Robert Homer Mollohan co-stars and co-wrote the script. It also co-stars Sarah Shahi, Lisa Bonet, Michael Raymond-James, Chris Browning, Timothy V. Murphy, and Wes Studi. The film was released on July 11, 2014.

Plot

After murdering his mother's rapist, Wolf, a Native American, flees from the law. Six months later he meets up with a drifter called Cash and heads north to his sister's property where he intends to go spread his mother's ashes, but with the law right behind him his dream to lay his mother to peace may come at a price.

Cast
Jason Momoa as Robert Wolf
Sarah Shahi as Eva
Lisa Bonet as Magdalena
Michael Raymond-James as Irish
Wes Studi as Numay
Jill Wagner as Sandy
Timothy V. Murphy as Williams
Chris Browning as Schaeffer
James Harvey Ward as Billy
Linden Chiles as Bob
Steve Reevis as Totonka
Tanoai Reed as Moose
Robert Homer Mollohan as Cash
Lance Henriksen as FBI Agent Kelly

Production
In October 2011 Jason Momoa stated that he was writing, directing and acting in an upcoming project, Road to Paloma. Made for $600,000, filming began in February 2012 in Needles, California, where half of the filming was to be done. The rest took place in Los Angeles and Bishop.

Momoa set Shovels & Rope and The Rolling Stones to score the music for the film.

Filming
Filming was scheduled to begin in February 2012 in Needles, California, where half of the filming was to be done with the rest set to take place in Los Angeles and Bishop.

Additional scenes filmed near Mexican Hat, Monument Valley and Kayenta.  End scenes possibly Henrys Fork of Green River near Kings Peak in the high Uintas.

Release
On August 13, 2013 it was announced that WWE Studios and Anchor Bay Entertainment had acquired distribution rights in North America, United Kingdom, Australia and New Zealand. A late 2013 release was planned. The film premiered at 2014 Sarasota Film Festival in April. The film gained positive reviews.

Reception
Road to Paloma got "mixed to average" reviews from Metacritic, receiving 44 out of a 100, based on 8 reviews. On Rotten Tomatoes, the film holds a rating of 57%, based on 14 reviews, with an average rating of 5.5/10.

Frank Scheck of The Hollywood Reporter said that the film is "straining mightily for a mythic quality and reaching a predictably melancholic, violent conclusion, Road to Paloma mainly comes across as a vanity project star vehicle. Jeannette Catsoulis of The New York Times criticized "the film's loose naturalism" , but praised its strong acting, specifically "Chris Browning, as a liaison between the F.B.I. and the reservation", saying that in her opinion, "[that was] especially enjoyable".

Gary Goldstein of the Los Angeles Times said that "though there's nothing terribly profound or unique about actor Jason Momoa's feature writing-directing debut, 'Road to Paloma', it does prove an effective throwback to the loose-limbed, my-way-or-the-highway road movies of the Easy Rider era".

References

External links

Road to Paloma at the ComingSoon.net

Films shot in Los Angeles
Films shot in California
2010s road movies
American road movies
2014 thriller drama films
American thriller drama films
WWE Studios films
American chase films
Motorcycling films
Films about Native Americans
2014 directorial debut films
2014 drama films
2010s English-language films
2010s American films